Thomas Murray (born 5 February 1933), known as Tom or Tommy Murray, is a Scottish former footballer who played as an inside forward in the Football League for Darlington, in the Scottish League for St Johnstone, Alloa Athletic, Albion Rovers and Stranraer, and in the Southern League for Headington United.

References

1933 births
Living people
Footballers from Airdrie, North Lanarkshire
Scottish footballers
Association football inside forwards
Oxford United F.C. players
Darlington F.C. players
St Johnstone F.C. players
Alloa Athletic F.C. players
Albion Rovers F.C. players
Stranraer F.C. players
Southern Football League players
English Football League players
Scottish Football League players